"Future Management" is a song composed and performed by English musician Roger Taylor. It was released in March 1981 as the first single from his 1981 debut album Fun in Space. The song reached No. 49 on the UK Singles Chart. It is Taylor's second solo single, after his debut "I Wanna Testify" in 1977.

Track listing 
All songs written by Roger Taylor. 
 1981 UK 7" single
 "Future Management" – 2:57
 "Laugh or Cry" – 3:07

Personnel
Roger Taylor – drums, percussion, lead and backing vocals, guitars, bass guitar
David Richards – keyboards

Charts

References

External links

Lyrics of the song at Genius

1981 songs
1981 singles
Roger Taylor (Queen drummer) songs
Songs written by Roger Taylor (Queen drummer)
EMI Records singles